The Sydney light rail network (or Sydney Light Rail) is a light rail/tram system serving the city of Sydney, New South Wales, Australia. The network currently consists of three passenger routes, the L1 Dulwich Hill, L2 Randwick and L3 Kingsford lines. A fourth line, the  Parramatta Light Rail in Sydney's west, is currently under construction and planned to open in May 2024. 

The network is managed by Transport for NSW, with day-to-day operation contracted to Transdev. In 2022, 25.67 million passenger journeys were made on the network. This equates to ridership of over 70,000 daily passenger journeys.

History

In the 19th and early 20th centuries, Sydney developed an extensive tram network, which grew to be the second largest in the Southern Hemisphere and second largest in the Commonwealth after London. The increasing rate of private car ownership, perception that trams contributed to traffic congestion and the general rundown conditions of the network due to the lack of funding after World War II led to the progressive replacement of tram services with buses, with the final section of the tram network closing on 25 February 1961.

In the 1980s and 1990s, the inner city areas of Darling Harbour and Pyrmont were the subject of an urban renewal program. In 1988 the Sydney Monorail opened, connecting Darling Harbour to the central business district. With poor integration between the monorail and other transport modes, and the increasing redevelopment of the Pyrmont peninsula – including the establishment of Sydney's first legal casino – it was decided to convert a disused section of the Metropolitan Goods railway line into a light rail line. A section of track between Pyrmont and Haymarket was upgraded and a new on-street section was built to link the line to Central railway station. The line was set up as a public-private partnership. It opened in August 1997, running between Central station and Wentworth Park, Pyrmont.

The private owner soon made proposals for a western extension continuing along the disused goods line, plus a new line through the central business district from Central to Circular Quay. The western extension opened in 2000, terminating at Lilyfield, but the company was unsuccessful in its attempts to develop a CBD line, which saw development of light rail stagnate for the remainder of the decade.

By contrast, the 2010s have seen major expansion and reform of light rail in Sydney including the announcement and delivery of multiple new infrastructure projects, integration of ticketing with the city's other transport modes, the introduction of new trams and the transfer of the network to full public ownership. The extensions announced during the decade total almost .

Ownership and operation

Public-private partnership

In March 1994, the Sydney Light Rail Company (SLRC) was formed. SLRC was awarded a 30-year concession to operate the light rail system until February 2028 when ownership would pass to the New South Wales Government. The contract gave the company significant control over the commercial arrangements relating to future extensions or interconnecting lines. Operation of the line was contracted to TNT Transit Systems, which also owned the Sydney Monorail.

The SLRC purchased TNT Transit Systems in August 1998 as part of a joint venture with CGEA Transport. This resulted in CGEA Transport taking over the light rail operating contract. CGEA Transport and its successors have operated the inner city light rail network ever since.

In early 2001, Connex (renamed from CGEA Transport in 1999) sold its share of the monorail to the SLRC, bringing the monorail and light rail under unified ownership and leading to the formation of Metro Transport Sydney.

The New South Wales Government purchased Metro Transport Sydney in March 2012, and the company was placed under the control of Transport for NSW. The purchase removed the contractual restrictions on expanding the light rail network and allowed the government to dismantle the monorail, assisting its plans to redevelop the Sydney Convention & Exhibition Centre.

Government ownership

From 1 July 2013, the Metro Light Rail brand was phased out as part of a broader rebranding and reorganisation of public transport services in New South Wales. The process of shutting down Metro Transport Sydney and transferring assets to Transport for NSW was completed in September 2014.

Following the announcement of the CBD and South East Light Rail, the government decided to group the contract covering construction of the new line with the operation and maintenance both lines of the inner city network. In December 2014, Transport for NSW awarded the contract to the ALTRAC Light Rail consortium. This sees Transdev Sydney, the operator under the previous contract, continue to operate and maintain the network as part of the consortium. The operating contract commenced on 1 July 2015 and runs until 2034.

After taking control of the Inner West Light Rail and announcing the CBD and South East Light Rail, the government also moved to establish a separate network centred around the Western Sydney suburb of Parramatta. Transdev will also operate the Parramatta network as part of the Great River City Light Rail consortium. This contract runs for eight years from construction completion, with a possible extension of up to an additional ten years.

Operations

Network
Sydney's light rail network consists of:
Inner West Light Rail – serviced by L1 Dulwich Hill Line
CBD and South East Light Rail – serviced by L2 Randwick Line and L3 Kingsford Line
Parramatta Light Rail (under construction, stage 1 to open in May 2024)

[
{
  "type": "ExternalData",
  "service": "page",
  "title": "Inner West Light Rail.map"
},
{
  "type": "ExternalData",
  "service": "page",
  "title": "Parramatta Light Rail.map"
},
{
  "type": "ExternalData",
  "service": "page",
  "title": "CBD and South East Light Rail.map"
}
]

L1 Dulwich Hill Line

The L1 Dulwich Hill Line is the network's original passenger route, first commenced in August 1997. It operates along the  Inner West Light Rail between Central station and Dulwich Hill, stopping at 23 stops along the route. It connects Sydney's Inner West with the Pyrmont peninsula, Darling Harbour and at the southern end of the central business district. 

Majority of the Inner West Light Rail line is along the alignment of a former freight railway line, with a short on-street section at the city end. The line opened between Central railway station in the city and Wentworth Park, Pyrmont in August 1997, then extended west to Lilyfield in August 2000, and then south-west to Dulwich Hill in March 2014.

From late October 2021 to February 2022, services were replaced by buses after major cracks were found in all 12 Urbos 3 trams serving the line. Limited service was then restored with borrowed Citadis trams from the CBD and South East Light Rail.
[
{
  "type": "ExternalData",
  "service": "page",
  "title": "Inner West Light Rail.map"
},
{
  "type": "ExternalData",
  "service": "page",
  "title": "Inner West Light Rail stops.map"
}
]

L2 Randwick & L3 Kingsford Lines

The L2 Randwick Line and L3 Kingsford Line are Sydney's newest passenger routes on the Sydney light rail network. L2 Randwick Line services commenced on 14 December 2019, while L3 Kingsford Line services commenced operations on 3 April 2020. They operate on the CBD and South East Light Rail, between Circular Quay at the northern end of the central business district to Central station at the southern end, then continuing to the south-eastern suburbs.

CBD and South East Light Rail was built to reduce bus congestion in the CBD and provides higher capacity public transport to the Sydney Football Stadium, Sydney Cricket Ground, Randwick Racecourse and the University of New South Wales, which were previously served only by buses. In contrast to the Inner West Light Rail, the line is mostly on-street and follows a similar path to routes used by the former tramway network. Major construction began in October 2015.

[{"type":"ExternalData",
"service":"page",
"title":"CBD and South East Light Rail.map"},
{"type":"ExternalData",
"service":"page",
"title":"CBD and South East Light Rail stops.map"}]

Under construction

Parramatta lines

Parramatta Light Rail is the name given to two planned lines that converge on the Western Sydney centre of Parramatta.

The first line runs from Carlingford to Westmead via the Parramatta CBD. It includes the conversion of most of the former heavy rail Carlingford line to light rail standards. Construction began in 2018 and is expected to be completed in May 2024.

The preferred route for the second line was announced in October 2017. This line branches from the first line at Rydalmere and travels through Ermington, Melrose Park, Wentworth Point and on to the Sydney Olympic Park events precinct.

The lines will have no connection to the Inner West or CBD and South East lines.
[
{
  "type": "ExternalData",
  "service": "page",
  "title": "Parramatta Light Rail stage 2.map"
},
{
  "type": "ExternalData",
  "service": "page",
  "title": "Parramatta Light Rail.map"
},
{
  "type": "ExternalData",
  "service": "page",
  "title": "Parramatta Light Rail stops.map"
}
]

Rolling stock
All services on the Inner West Light Rail were previously operated by a single class of tram. A second class was introduced to operate services on the CBD and South East Light Rail. All vehicles to have operated on the system have been articulated, low floor and bi-directional. The system uses standard gauge track and 750 volt direct current electrification.

Both lines use different specifications on a range of measures including gaps between platforms and carriages, height and width of the actual track, clearances between the track corridor and its surrounds, and distance between the back wheels of the trams. As a result, Urbos 3 trams on the Inner West Light Rail (L1 Dulwich Hill) line are unable to serve on the CBD and South East Light Rail (L2 Randwick and L3 Kingsford) lines However, trams used on the CBD and South East Light Rail (Citadis 305) are able to run on the Inner West Light Rail as the vehicles are narrower. This was to allow the fleet to access the Lilyfield maintenance centre via the Inner West Light Rail. This also allowed Citadis trams to be used for L1 Dulwich Hill services on the Inner West Light Rail from February 2022.

Urbos 3

Inner West Light Rail 

Following the  extension of the Inner West Light Rail to Dulwich Hill, more rolling stock was needed to support services and run alongside the Variotrams that had been providing services on the line since the first section opened in 1997. A tender for six Urbos 3s was awarded to  Construcciones y Auxiliar de Ferrocarriles (CAF) in August 2012. The first unit arrived in Sydney on 19 December 2013 and entered service on 24 July 2014. All were in service by August, allowing the leased Urbos 2s to be returned to Spain.

On 11 October 2013, the Government announced an order for six additional Urbos 3s to replace the Variotrams. All Urbos 3s from the additional order had entered service by the end of June 2015.

The seats on the first batch are generally in the transverse configuration – at 90 degrees to the sides of the vehicle. The second batch replace some of the transverse seats with longitudinal seating, providing more standing room. Digital voice announcements and internal dot-matrix displays provide information about the next stop. They have a standard capacity of 206 passengers and a crush capacity of 272. The vehicles are numbered 2112, 2114–2124. 2113 was skipped due to superstition, particularly among the Chinese who travel to the Star casino by light rail, about numbers ending in 13.

On 28 October 2021, service was suspended on the Inner West Light Rail after cracking in welds was discovered in some of the Urbos 3 vehicles during routine inspections. On 2 November, it was revealed that cracks had been found in the entire Urbos 3 fleet of 12 vehicles. On 5 November, it was announced the line would be closed for up to 18 months to allow the fleet to be withdrawn for repairs. These cracks were discovered to be "more significant than first thought". The government announced that there was a "design flaw" in the vehicles and they would be consulting other operators.

Parramatta Light Rail 
Stage 1 of the Parramatta Light Rail will be operated by a fleet of thirteen Urbos 3 vehicles. These vehicles will support wire-free operation using batteries, which will be utilised on the on-street sections of the line around Parramatta and Westmead.

Citadis 305

As part of the winning consortium to build and operate the CBD and South East Light Rail, Alstom supplied sixty Citadis 305 trams. Each vehicle consists of five sections, and they are coupled together to operate in pairs of two. Wire-free operation in a section of George Street between Bathurst Street and Circular Quay was to be achieved via battery storage. In December 2014, it was announced that Alstom's proprietary APS technology would be used in place of batteries.

The first unit was completed in May 2017. The first six were manufactured in La Rochelle, France, the remaining 54 in Barcelona, Spain. They are numbered 001–060.

After the entire Urbos 3 fleet of the Inner West Light Rail was withdrawn for repairs in November 2021, Citadis trams were borrowed from the CBD and South East Light Rail and tested on the Inner West Light Rail from December 2021. The Citadis vehicles began services on the Inner West Light Rail on 12 February 2022 until the Urbos 3 fleet could be repaired and brought back into service.

Withdrawn

Variotram 

The network's original rolling stock was the Variotram which was introduced with the opening of the first section of the Inner West Light Rail in 1997. Seven German-designed vehicles were manufactured by Adtranz in Dandenong. The Variotram design is modular and was extended for the Sydney system. The capacity of the vehicles was 217 passengers, of which 74 were seated. The first was damaged in an accident near  while on its delivery run and had to be returned to Melbourne for repairs. On tests up to three trams were coupled together allowing a maximum capacity of 600 passengers if required. They were numbered 2101–2107, continuing the Sydney trams sequence that finished at 2087 with the last Sydney R1-Class Tram.

The design weight was reduced to compensate for the addition of climate-control air-conditioning equipment. Each was fitted with three double doors each side which had enhanced safety systems with obstacle detection interlocked with the traction system. Seats were generally in the transverse configuration – at 90 degrees to the sides of the vehicle. In 2014, the original external destination rolls were replaced with dot-matrix displays and digital voice announcements were installed. There were no internal displays. The last Variotram was withdrawn from service after operating overnight between Central and The Star on 27/28 May 2015.

After sustaining damage in a derailment at Glebe on 7 October 2013, Variotram number 2106 was scrapped. The remaining six Variotrams were placed into storage in Penrith during the first half of 2015. Having been retained by Transport Heritage NSW, in October 2018, 2107 was placed in the custody of the Sydney Tramway Museum, Loftus. The remaining five (2101–2105) were scrapped in early 2018.

Urbos 2 

Four leased CAF Urbos 2 trams were introduced on the Inner West Light Rail in 2014. They entered service to coincide with the extension of the line to Dulwich Hill, supplementing the Variotrams and ensuring service frequencies on the line could be maintained. The four trams had previously operated in Spain. Three units (2108–2110) were from Vélez-Málaga, where they operated between 2006 and 2012. The other tram (2111) was from Seville. The first Urbos 2 arrived in Sydney on 4 September 2013. Delivery was completed in November. The trams entered service on 22 March 2014, five days before the opening of the extension to Dulwich Hill. Following the introduction of the Urbos 3 trams in July 2014, the Urbos 2s were withdrawn and returned to Spain. The Urbos 2s were unpopular with passengers and attracted complaints.

The trams featured four double and two single doors on each side. The seats were unpadded and were generally built in the longitudinal seating configuration – running parallel to the sides of the vehicle's body. Digital voice announcements and internal dot-matrix displays provided information about the next stop.

Patronage

The following table lists patronage figures for the network during the corresponding financial year. Australia's financial years start on 1 July and end on 30 June. Major events that affected the number of journeys made or how patronage is measured are included as notes.

Ticketing and fares

The smartcard-based Opal Card ticketing system, which was introduced to the network on 1 December 2014 is valid on metro, train, bus, ferry and light rail services. Different fares apply for these modes, except that the same fares apply to light rail and buses. However, they are treated as separate modes for fare calculation purposes. Light rail stops feature Opal top-up machines that also sell Opal single trip tickets. The single trip tickets are more expensive than the standard Opal fare. They are only valid for travel on light rail and must be used on the day of purchase. The following table lists Opal fares for reusable smartcards and single trip tickets

^ = $2.50 for Senior/Pensioner cardholders

Fares are calculated using straight line distance between the origin and destination stops.

When it first opened, the Inner West Light Rail used its own paper-based ticketing system. Paper tickets were originally sold from ticket machines on stop platforms but were later issued by conductors on board. During the 2010s, this system gradually merged with the broader Sydney ticketing system, culminating in the introduction of Opal and the withdrawal of all other tickets. This process was completed on 1 August 2016.

Potential extensions
Several transport corridors have significant potential to allow for the growth of the network beyond its current route structure.

Anzac Parade

The New South Wales Government's 2012 policy document entitled Sydney's Light Rail Future proposed investigating an extension of the CBD and South East Light Rail along the southern Anzac Parade corridor.

By 2014, an initial investigation had commenced. Three potential options were examined; a  extension to Maroubra Junction, a  extension to Malabar and an  extension to La Perouse.

The government's 2018 Greater Sydney Services and Infrastructure Plan included a proposal for an extension to Maroubra Junction. The extension would however not be developed for at least 10 years.

The Bays Precinct
The Bays Precinct is a large waterfront area to the west of the Sydney CBD being proposed for urban renewal by the New South Wales Government. The southern part of the precinct is served by the existing Inner West Light Rail. A planning document released by the government in October 2015 suggested light rail could be extended to the northern part of the precinct, possibly utilising the Glebe Island Bridge.

The government's 2018 Greater Sydney Services and Infrastructure Plan included a proposal for a new line from Leichhardt North to Pyrmont via The Bays Precinct and the Glebe Island Bridge. It would connect with the existing Inner West Light Rail at both ends. The line wouldn't be developed for at least 10 years.

Parramatta Light Rail extensions
The New South Wales Government's 2012 policy document entitled Sydney's Light Rail Future proposed investigating a Western Sydney light rail network. This led to a number of corridors being investigated in the early planning stages of the Parramatta Light Rail project. The final corridors selected for development were announced in 2015.

In early 2017, Transport for NSW had begun an investigation into an extension of the Parramatta Light Rail from Carlingford to Epping.

The government's 2018 Greater Sydney Services and Infrastructure Plan proposed investigating unspecified extensions to the network. The extensions wouldn't be developed for at least 10 years.

Green Square
In 2012, the City of Sydney Council recommended that a Light Rail link be built from the city to Green Square, to service the commercial and residential developments being built in the area, which is expected to become Australia's most densely populated precinct. The council has spent more than $30 million buying land for a light rail corridor. In July 2015, New South Wales Transport Minister Andrew Constance stated that the area was likely to be served by a light rail link in the future. This led to a decision in October by the City of Sydney to allocate $445,000 to develop plans for a light rail line from the city to Green Square. The council estimated a link would cost $350–500 million to build.

Bondi 
In 2011, Waverley Council advocated for the extension of the light rail network to link the current infrastructure to Bondi Junction and Bondi Beach. The council commissioned AECOM to undertake a feasibility assessment of the reintroduction of light rail on the corridor between Bondi Beach and Bondi Junction (Stage 1) and onto the CBD (Stage 2) to achieve mass transit of passengers and requested Transport for NSW consider the CBD to Bondi Beach corridor as a priority route in the Sydney Light Rail Plan.

See also

 List of tram and light-rail transit systems
 Newcastle Light Rail
 Public transport in Sydney
 Railways in Sydney

Notes

References

External links

Official Site
Transdev Sydney Official Site
Information about the extensions
Ticketing information

 
Transdev
750 V DC railway electrification
Railway lines opened in 1997
1997 establishments in Australia